Den Røde Løve was a 70-ton ship of the Dano-Norwegian navy. It served during the early 17th century, when it was recorded as carrying 6 guns.

The name is Danish for "The Red Lion"; it was also known as Løven ("the Lion").

The ship was considered slow and ill-equipped for sailing close to the wind. It was considered an older ship on a naval list from 1611.

Den Røde Løve served as Godske Lindenov's ship during the 1605 Hans Køning expedition to Greenland and John Cunningham's during the Lindenov expedition the next year. These expeditions had been organized by King Christian IV in order to reestablish contact with the lost Norse settlements on Greenland and then to exploit the silver and gold ore supposedly returned by the first expedition. There was a third expedition in 1607, but Den Røde Løve was not sent.

Notes

See also
 Christian IV's expeditions to Greenland
 Dano-Norwegian Navy
 Danish colonization of Greenland

References

Ships of the Royal Dano-Norwegian Navy
1600s ships